The Sonderfahndungsliste G.B. ("Special Search List Great Britain") was a secret list of prominent British residents to be arrested, produced in 1940 by the SS as part of the preparation for the proposed invasion of Britain. After the war, the list became known as The Black Book.

The information was prepared by the Reich Security Main Office (RSHA) under Reinhard Heydrich. Later, SS-Oberführer Walter Schellenberg claimed in his memoirs that he had compiled the list, starting at the end of June 1940. It contained 2,820 names of people, including British nationals and European exiles, who were to be immediately arrested by SS Einsatzgruppen upon the invasion, occupation, and annexation of Great Britain to Nazi Germany. Abbreviations after each name indicated whether the individual was to be detained by RSHA Amt IV (the Gestapo) or Amt VI (Ausland-SD, Foreign Intelligence).

The list was printed as a supplement or appendix to the secret Informationsheft G.B. handbook, which Schellenberg also claimed to have written. This handbook noted opportunities for looting, and named potentially dangerous anti-Nazi institutions including Masonic lodges, the Church of England and the Boy Scouts. On 17 September 1940, SS-Brigadeführer Dr Franz Six was designated to a position in London where he would implement the post-invasion arrests and actions against institutions, but on the same day, Hitler postponed the invasion indefinitely. In September 1945, at the end of the war, the list was discovered in Berlin. Reporting included the reactions of some of the people listed.

Background

The list was similar to earlier lists prepared by the SS, such as the Special Prosecution Book-Poland prepared before the Second World War by members of the German fifth column in cooperation with German Intelligence, and used to target the 61,000 Polish people on this list during Operation Tannenberg and Intelligenzaktion in occupied Poland between 1939 and 1941.

Rapid German victories led quickly to the Fall of France, and British forces had to be withdrawn during the Dunkirk evacuation, with the Nazi spearhead reaching the coast on 21 May 1940. It was only then that the prospect of invading Britain was raised with Hitler, and the German high command did not issue any orders for preparations until 2 July. Eventually, on 16 July, Hitler issued his Directive no. 16 ordering preparation for invasion, codenamed Operation Sea Lion.

German intelligence set out to provide their invading forces with encyclopaedic handbooks giving useful information. Seven maps, each covering the whole of the British Isles, covered different topographical aspects. A book provided 174 photographs, mostly aerial photography, supplemented with views cut out from newspapers and magazines. A mass of information was included in a book on Military-Geographical Data about England. Only one book was marked secret, the Informationsheft GB. Walter Schellenberg wrote in his memoirs that "at the end of June 1940 I was ordered to prepare a small handbook for the invading troops and the political and administrative units that would accompany them, describing briefly the most important political, administrative and economic institutions of Great Britain and the leading public figures."

Description
The Sonderfahndungsliste G.B. was an appendix or supplement to the secret handbook Informationsheft Grossbritannien (Informationsheft GB), which provided information for German security services about institutions thought likely to resist the Nazis, including the private public schools, the Church of England, and the Boy Scouts. A general survey of British museums and art galleries suggested opportunities for looting. The handbook described the organisation of the British police and had a section analysing the British intelligence agencies. Following this, four pages had around 30 passport-sized photographs of individuals who also appeared in the appendix.

The appendix, of 104 pages, was a list in alphabetical order of 2,820 names, some of which were duplicated. The term Fahndungsliste translates into "wanted list", and Sonderfahndungsliste into "specially" or "especially wanted list". The instructions "Sämtliche in der Sonderfahndungsliste G.B. aufgefürten Personen sind festzunehmen" ("all persons listed in the Special Wanted List G.B. are to be arrested") made this clear.

Beside each name was the number of the Reich Security Main Office (RSHA) to which the person was to be handed over. Churchill was to be placed into the custody of Amt VI  (Ausland-SD, Foreign Intelligence), but the vast majority of the people listed in the Black Book would be placed into the custody of Amt IV (Gestapo). The book had some significant errors, such as people who had died (Lytton Strachey, died in 1932) or were no longer based in the UK (Paul Robeson, moved back to the United States in 1939), and omissions (such as George Bernard Shaw, one of the few English language writers whose works were published and performed in Nazi Germany).

("Secret!") is printed on the cover. The facsimile version shows the printing in red, on a pale grey-green cover, and has 376 pages.

Post-war discovery
A print run of the list produced around 20,000 booklets, but the warehouse in which they were stored was destroyed in a bombing raid, and only two originals are known to survive.  One is in the Imperial War Museum in London, and one is noted in the Hoover Institution Library and Archives.

On 14 September 1945, The Guardian reported that the booklet had been discovered in the Berlin headquarters of the Reich Security Police (Reich Security Main Office).  When told the previous day that they were on the Gestapo's list, Lady Astor  ("enemy of Germany") said "It is the complete answer to the terrible lie that the so-called 'Cliveden Set' was pro-Fascist", while  Lord Vansittart said "The German black-list might indicate to some of those who now find themselves on it that their views, divergent from mine, were somewhat misplaced. Perhaps it will be an eye-opener to them", and the cartoonist David Low said "That is all right. I had them on my list too."

Being included on the list was considered something of a mark of honour.  Noël Coward recalled that, on learning of the book, Rebecca West sent him a telegram saying "My dear—the people we should have been seen dead with."

Notable people listed

 Lascelles Abercrombie, poet, literary critic and English language professor. Erroneous listing as Professor Abercrombie had died in 1938.
 Richard Acland, "anti-Fascist Liberal M.P."
 David Adams, Labour politician
 Vyvyan Adams, Conservative Party politician
 Jennie Adamson, Labour politician
 Christopher Addison, 1st Viscount Addison, medical doctor and politician
 Friedrich Adler, Austrian socialist politician and revolutionary
 Henrietta Adler (listed as Nettie Adler), Jewish Liberal politician
 Max Aitken, Lord Beaverbrook, Anglo-Canadian business tycoon, listed as "Beaverbrook"
 Leopold Amery, Conservative politician and journalist
 Fergus Anderson, two-time Grand Prix motorcycle road-racing World Champion
 Sir Norman Angell, Labour MP awarded the Nobel Peace Prize in 1933
 Frederick Antal,  born Frigyes Antal, later known as Friedrich Antal, a Jewish Hungarian art historian
 John Jacob Astor, 1st Baron Astor of Hever, American-born English newspaper proprietor, politician, sportsman, military officer, and a member of the Astor family
 Nancy Astor, Viscountess Astor, American-born English socialite and Conservative MP, listed as "enemy of Germany"
 Katharine Stewart-Murray, Duchess of Atholl (listed as Catherine, Duchess of Athol), Scottish Unionist Party politician, supporter of Republican Spain and outspoken opponent of fascism
 Clement Attlee, featured twice, as "Attlee, Clement Richard, major", and as "Attlee, Clemens, leader Labour party"
 Robert Baden-Powell, founder and leader of Scouting, which the Nazis regarded as a spy organisation
 Edvard Beneš, President of the Czechoslovak government in exile
 J. D. Bernal, scientist and communist
 Violet Bonham Carter, anti-fascist Liberal politician. Referred to as "an Encirclement lady politician"
 Vera Brittain, feminist writer and pacifist
 Fenner Brockway, socialist and politician.
 "Harry Bullock", thought to be a mistake for Guy Henry Bullock, diplomat and Everest mountaineer
 Neville Chamberlain, "political, former prime minister", died 9 November 1940
 Sydney Chapman, economist and civil servant
 Winston Churchill, prime minister
 Sir Walter Citrine, trade unionist
 Marthe Cnockaert, First World War spy
 Claud Cockburn, journalist
 Seymour Cocks, Labour politician
 Chapman Cohen, secularist writer and editor  
 Lionel Leonard Cohen, lawyer
 Robert Waley Cohen, industrialist
 G. D. H. Cole, academic
 Norman Collins, broadcasting executive
 Edward Conze, Anglo-German scholar
 Duff Cooper, Minister of Information
 Pierre Coalfleet, aka Frank Davison, writer
 Margery Corbett Ashby, feminist
 Noël Coward, high-profile actor and armed forces entertainer who opposed appeasement, connections with MI5
 Sir Stafford Cripps, Labour politician
 Nancy Cunard, writer, heiress and anti-fascist
 Frederick Francis Charles Curtis, architect
 Sefton Delmer, journalist
 Anthony Eden, Secretary of State for War
 Jacob Epstein, sculptor
 Lion Feuchtwanger, German Jewish novelist and playwright
 Frank Foley, spy who as MI6 Head of Station in pre-war Berlin rescued thousands of German Jews
 E. M. Forster, author
 Sigmund Freud, Jewish founder of psychoanalysis (died 23 September 1939)
 Willie Gallacher MP, trade unionist and communist politician
 Charles de Gaulle, Free French leader and general, listed as "former French General"
 Sir Philip Gibbs, journalist and novelist
 Victor Gollancz, publisher
 J. B. S. Haldane, geneticist, evolutionary biologist and communist
 Ernst Hanfstaengl, German refugee. Once a financial backer of Hitler, he had fallen from favour and had fled Germany in 1937
 Aldous Huxley, author (who had emigrated to the US in 1936)
 Cyril Edwin Joad, educator
 Egon Erwin Kisch, Austrian-Czechoslovak Jewish writer and journalist, listed as "Egon Erwin Kich"
 Alexander Korda, Hungarian-born British producer and film director
 George Lansbury, "rules German emigrant political circles"
 Harold Laski, political theorist, economist and author
 Megan Lloyd George, politician, daughter of David Lloyd George, who was not on the list
 David Low, political cartoonist and caricaturist
 F. L. Lucas, literary critic, writer and anti-fascist campaigner
 Geoffrey Mander, Liberal politician (critic of Appeasement and crusader on behalf of the League of Nations), manufacturer and art collector.
 Heinrich Mann, German novelist and anti-fascist
 Jan Masaryk, foreign minister of the Czechoslovak government in exile
 Jimmy Maxton, pacifist politician
 Naomi Mitchison, novelist
 Gilbert Murray, classical scholar and activist for the League of Nations
 Harold Nicolson, as "Nicholson", diplomat, author and diarist
 Philip Noel-Baker, Labour politician
 Conrad O'Brien-ffrench, SIS/MI6 Agent ST36, Agent Z3 for Dansey's Z Organization
 Vic Oliver, British actor and radio comedian, originally from Austria and married to Winston Churchill's daughter Sarah, listed as "Olivier, Jewish actor".
 Ignacy Jan Paderewski, pianist, former prime minister of Poland
 R. Palme Dutt, journalist and theoretician of the Communist Party of Great Britain
 Sylvia Pankhurst, suffragist, writer, journalist and anti-fascist
 Nikolaus Pevsner, German (and later British) architectural historian
 Harry Pollitt, General Secretary of the Communist Party of Great Britain
 J. B. Priestley, creator of anti-Nazi popular broadcasts and fiction
 Eleanor Rathbone MP, activist for assistance to refugees
 Hermann Rauschning, German refugee and once personal friend of Hitler who had turned against him
 Douglas Reed, journalist and author
 Paul Robeson, African-American singer/actor with strong Communist affiliations
 Dr Agnes Maude Royden, suffragist, author, preacher, philosopher, pacifist
 Sir Thomas Royden, director and former chairman of Cunard Line (brother of Maude Royden)
 Bertrand Russell, philosopher, historian and pacifist
 Duncan Sandys, Conservative politician listed as "Dunkan Sandys"
 John Segrue, foreign correspondent for the News Chronicle
 Adolf Schallamach, scientist
 Sir Archibald Sinclair, Liberal politician
 Robert Smallbones, diplomat who granted visas to 48,000 Jews, recognized in 2010 as a British Hero of the Holocaust
Aline Atherton-Smith, Quaker
 C. P. Snow, physicist and novelist
 Stephen Spender, poet, novelist and essayist
 Lytton Strachey, died 1932, writer and critic
 Sybil Thorndike, actress
 Frank Cyril Tiarks, banker, director of the Bank of England, member British Union of Fascists and Anglo-German Fellowship.
 Gottfried Reinhold Treviranus, politician, former German minister
 Lord Vansittart, "leadership of British Intelligence Service, Chief Diplomatic Adviser to the Foreign Office"
 Beatrice Webb, socialist and economist
 Dr. Chaim Weizmann, Russian-born British lecturer and Zionist leader who had worked in Germany; later President of Israel
 H. G. Wells, author and socialist
 Rebecca West, suffragist and writer
 Ted Willis, dramatist
 Leonard Woolf, political theorist, author, publisher, and civil servant, husband of Virginia Woolf
 Virginia Woolf, novelist and essayist, wife of Leonard Woolf
 Alfred Zimmern, classical scholar, historian and political scientist
 Carl Zuckmayer, German writer and playwright
 Leonie Zuntz (1908–1942), German Hittitologist, refugee scholar at Somerville College, Oxford
 Stefan Zweig, Austrian Jewish writer

See also
 Special Prosecution Book-Poland
 Dr. Franz Six. SS official appointed by Reinhard Heydrich to direct state police operations in German-occupied Great Britain.

References

Bibliography
 . Accessed at the Imperial War Museum Amazon search inside
  Chapter 22, pp. 936–940 in 1964 Pan Books paperback – "If the invasion succeeded", discusses the black book and its contents.
 
 
  – complete list of names

External links
 
 
  Facsimile reprint series, Imperial War Museum London, 

Einsatzgruppen
Cultural history of World War II
Lists of British people
Blacklisting in the United Kingdom
1940 documents